Gaehwadang imun (개화당 이문) is a 1932 Korean film written, directed by and starring Na Woon-gyu. It premiered at Dan Sung Sa theater in downtown Seoul.

Plot summary
The film concerns the 3-day rule of Kim Ok-kyun (1851–1894), and his attempt to modernize Korea.

See also
 Korea under Japanese rule
 List of Korean-language films
 Cinema of Korea

References
 

1932 films
Pre-1948 Korean films
Korean silent films
Korean black-and-white films
Korean-language films
Films directed by Na Woon-gyu